RNA-binding protein 25 is a protein that in humans is encoded by the RBM25 gene.

References

Further reading